Vergi(um) is also a town and former Catholic bishopric, now Berja, in southern Spain, now a Latin titular see

Vergi is a village in Haljala Parish, Lääne-Viru County, in northern Estonia, on the territory of Lahemaa National Park.

Gallery

References

 

Villages in Lääne-Viru County